Alpha-(1,3)-fucosyltransferase is an enzyme that in humans is encoded by the FUT6 gene.

The alpha-1,3-fucosyltransferases constitute a large family of glycosyltransferases with a high degree of homology. The enzymes of this family comprise 3 main activity patterns called myeloid, plasma, and Lewis, based on their capacity to transfer alpha-L-fucose to distinct oligosaccharide acceptors, their sensitivity to N-ethylmaleimide inhibition, their cation requirements, and their tissue-specific expression patterns. The different categories of alpha-1,3-fucosyltransferases are sequentially expressed during embryo-fetal development.[supplied by OMIM]

References

Further reading